Craft is a Swedish black metal band, originally formed under the name "Nocta" in 1994. As Nocta they recorded an unreleased demo in 1997 and subsequently changed their name to "Craft". While musically inspired by early black metal acts such as Burzum and Darkthrone, as well as heavy metal bands such as Black Sabbath and Celtic Frost, their lyrics focus on misanthropy, destruction, hate, Anti-Cosmic Satanism and death resembling the older lyrics of melodic black/death metal band Dissection. After drummer Daniel Halén decided to quit the band in 2005, the remaining members briefly considered putting the band on indefinite hold, but decided to continue and address his replacement in the future. In 2008 Dirge Rep (Gehenna, ex-Gorgoroth, ex-Enslaved) joined the band on session basis to work on the drums for the coming album which was released in August 2011. They released their fifth album White Noise and Black Metal on 22 June 2018.

Members
Current
 Mikael Nox – vocals
 Joakim Karlsson – lead guitar, bass and lyrics
 Alex Purkis – bass
 Dirge Rep – (session) drums

Former
 John Doe – guitar (1997–2017)
 Daniel Halén – drums (1994–2005)
 Björn Petterson – Session vocals on Total Soul Rape

Guests
 Björn, Kaos131 and Shamaatae – "additional noise and creative madness" on Fuck the Universe

Discography 
Studio albums
 Total Soul Rape (2000)
 Terror Propaganda: Second Black Metal Attack (2002)
 Fuck the Universe (2005)
 Void (2011)
 White Noise and Black Metal (2018)

Demos
 Total Eclipse (1999)

Sources
Interview (2002) with Thomas Legros on Voices from the Darkside
Interview (2006) on Ferrum

External links

1994 establishments in Sweden
Musical groups established in 1994
Swedish black metal musical groups
Season of Mist artists